Wojciech Kudlik (born 5 January 1954 in Nowy Sącz) is a former Polish slalom canoeist who competed in the 1970s and the 1980s.

He won two medals in the C-2 event at the ICF Canoe Slalom World Championships with a silver in 1975 and a bronze in 1979. He also won four medals in the C-2 team event with a gold (1979), a silver (1981) and two bronzes (1975, 1977).

Kudlik finished 13th in the C-2 event at the 1972 Summer Olympics in Munich.

References

1954 births
Canoeists at the 1972 Summer Olympics
Living people
Olympic canoeists of Poland
Polish male canoeists
Sportspeople from Nowy Sącz
Medalists at the ICF Canoe Slalom World Championships